Professor Qaisuddin or Kayes Uddin or Qayes Uddin was a Bangladeshi academic, researcher and chemist. He has served as the Vice Chancellor of two universities in Bangladesh, Islamic University, Bangladesh and Bangladesh Open University. He was the 5th Vice Chancellor of the Islamic University. He was a professor in the Department of Biochemistry, Rajshahi University. He was first academician of Bangladesh who act as vice-chancellor two university serially.

Early life 
Qaisuddin was born on 15 July 1937 in Alinagar Union of Gomstapur Upazila of Chapai Nawabganj District. Qaisuddin passed Honors from Rajshahi University in 1957, and completed his master's degree from University of Dhaka . He Received Commonwealth Scholarship for PhD Research from Glasgow University, UK in 1961 and He was awarded the Commonwealth Academic Staff Fellowship for post-doctoral research at the Imperial College of Science and Technology.

Career 
He was founding chairman of the biochemistry department at Rajshahi University in 1976. He was dean of the Faculty of Science of Rajshahi University, president of Rajshahi University Teachers Association (RUTA). At that time was syndicate member of Islamic University, Bangladesh.

Vice-Chancellorship 
He became the cice chancellor of Islamic University on 3 September 1997. And after serving here for 3 years, he joined Bangladesh Open University as a vice chancellor.

Works

Research 
He has published more than 50 research articles in local and foreign science journals. Important journal is:
 Kinetic studies on the catalytic reduction of o‐, m‐, and p‐nitrophenols by hydrazine
 M.K. Rahman, N. Absar, M. Shahjahan and M. Qaisuddin: Studies on the biochemicl and nutritional aspects of the defferent varieties of mangoes of Rajshahi region. Rajshahi University Studies, Part B, Vol. XVI, 209-219 (1988), Bangladesh.
 Molla, A. H., Rahman, M.B. & Qaisuddin, M. 1987.Biochemical and nutritional studies on the Bangladeshi fresh water eel, Anguilla bengalensis (Bao Baim). 33-39, ISSN 1023-6104, Publishers: Rajshahi University Zoological Society
 Central line-associated bloodstream infection in pediatric oncology patients in Qatar: A prospective study
 The quaternary alkaloids of Aspidsoperma peroba F. Allem. ex Sal
 Central line-associated bloodstream infection in pediatric oncology patients in Qatar: A prospective study
 Study of variability and correlation of some chemical characteristics in chilli (Capsicum annuum L.) [1991]
 Md. Ekramul Haque, M. Qaisuddin, and M. G. Hossain, Studies on the Physico-chemical Properties of Euphorhia helioscopia Lin, Seed Oil. Chittagong University Studies, Part-II, Science, 14(2): 29-35 (1990).
 Nikkon F, Haque ME, Islam MA and Qaisuddin M. (1995). Isolation of (-)-epicatechin from the stem bark of Averrhoa carambola Linn. J. Bio Sci., 3: 97-102.

Membership 

 Member of Bangladesh Medical Research Council
 Member of Bangladesh Chemical Society
 Member of the Board of Directors Rajshahi Krishi Unnoyon Bank

Conference 

 The 4th International Symposium on Anaerobic Digestion was held in Guangzhou, China with the support of UNESCO.
 Seminar on "Father of the Nation Bangabandhu Sheikh Mujibur Rahman & Emergence Bangladesh" was organized on December 16, 1997, at the South Asia Institute of Heidelberg University.

Awards 

 BJ Award from Bangladesh Journalist Association in 2001.
 Commonwealth Academic Staff Fellowship from Imperial College of Science and Technology.

References 

1937 births
Living people
Vice-Chancellors of the Islamic University, Bangladesh
People from Chapai Nawabganj district
Bangladeshi educators
Bangladeshi chemists
University of Rajshahi alumni
Academic staff of the University of Rajshahi
Alumni of the University of Glasgow
Alumni of Imperial College London